= Perserajuk =

Mountain in Avannaata, Greenland

- Location within Greenland

Highest point
- Elevation: 522 m (1,713 ft)
- Prominence: 223 m (732 ft)
- Coordinates: 69°23′48″N 50°20′00″W

Geography
- Location: Avannaata, Greenland

Perserajuk is a 522-metre (1,713 ft) high mountain in central Greenland.
